The Liffey Descent Canoe Race is an annual down river canoe and kayak race, of some 18 miles in length, that has been held on the River Liffey in Ireland since 1960.  It starts by the K Club above Straffan weir in County Kildare, and historically finished by the Dublin University Boat Club.  It is organised by the Irish Canoe Union  and is normally timed to coincide with The Liffey Swim. 2009 saw the 50th anniversary of this event.

In 2012 the event was added to the Classic Marathon Series of the International Canoe Federation. The race is aided by volunteer rescue divers from the Irish Underwater Council (principally from Aquatec Sub Aqua Club) who swim into the turbulent waters below several of the tougher weirs on the route to rescue struggling or overturned canoeists.

References 

Canoeing and kayaking competitions in Europe
Recurring sporting events established in 1960
Sport in County Kildare
Water sports in County Dublin
Sports competitions in Dublin (city)
Canoeing in Ireland